Feschuk is a surname. Notable people with the surname include:

Mike Feschuk (1932–2007), Canadian provincial politician
Scott Feschuk, Canadian speechwriter, humorist, and journalist